The Bayer designation ν Coronae Borealis (Nu Coronae Borealis) is an optical pair of stars in the constellation Corona Borealis:

ν1 Coronae Borealis
ν2 Coronae Borealis

As of 2011, the pair had an angular separation of  along a position angle of 164°.

References

Coronae Borealis, Nu
Corona Borealis
Double stars